Gwydir, an electoral district of the Legislative Assembly in the Australian state of New South Wales had two incarnations, from 1859 until 1894 and from 1904 until 1920.


Election results

Elections in the 1910s

1917

1913

1910

Elections in the 1900s

1907

1904

1894 - 1904

Elections in the 1890s

1891

Elections in the 1880s

1889

1887

1886 by-election

1885

1882

1880

Elections in the 1870s

1877

1874-75

1872

Elections in the 1860s

1869-70

1865 by-election

1865

1860

Elections in the 1850s

1859

Notes

References

New South Wales state electoral results by district